Jose Antonio Galilea Vedaurre is the Chilean entrepreneur and Minister of Agriculture under President Sebastián Piñera.

References

External links
 BCN Profile

Living people
Government ministers of Chile
1961 births
National Renewal (Chile) politicians
20th-century Chilean politicians
21st-century Chilean politicians
Members of the Chamber of Deputies of Chile
Ministers of Agriculture of Chile
People from Santiago